The Heart of Everything World Tour was a concert tour by Dutch symphonic metal band Within Temptation in support of their fourth album, The Heart of Everything.

Background

The Heart of Everything Tour was the first world tour for the band, in which they visited South American countries, as Brazil, Argentina and Chile for the first time. The band also performed at several large European festivals, such as Pinkpop, Pukkelpop and Download which helped the band to reach the status of a mainstream band throughout Europe, as The Heart of Everything appeared in several European charts.

The band started their very first U.S. tour a few months after the European release. The band opted to present itself on metal festivals as also on mainstream festivals, due to the diversity they presents throughout their discography. of The Heart of Everything, supporting Lacuna Coil, and appearing alongside In This Moment, Stolen Babies, The Gathering, and Kylesa. The tour, dubbed The Hottest Chicks in Metal Tour 2007. Lead vocalist Sharon den Adel classified it more of an "introductional" tour, as The Heart of Everything was not released in the United States yet. And, with the release of The Heart of Everything on 24 July 2007, the band decided to kick off their first headlining US tour in Fall 2007. The band played 13 shows, starting on 5 September 2007, in Boston and ended on 23 September 2007, in Tempe, Arizona.

At the end of 2007, the band professionally recorded a sold-out show for 8,000 visitors at the Beursgebouw, in The Netherlands, for a possible future DVD. On 7 February 2008, the band performed a special show accompanied by The Metropole Orchestra, the Pa'dam Choir, and special guests including George Oosthoek (ex-Orphanage), Anneke van Giersbergen of Agua de Annique and Keith Caputo of Life of Agony filmed by 14 HD cameras at the Ahoy Arena in Rotterdam, with an attendance of 10.000 people. This recording was later released as the main show of the Black Symphony DVD, and some parts of the show in Eindhoven came as an extra on the second disc of some editions of the album. Both shows featured special stage effects like explosions, pyro and fireworks.

Setlist

Tour dates

Personnel

Within Temptation
Sharon den Adel – vocals
Robert Westerholt – rhythm guitar 
Ruud Jolie – lead guitar
Martijn Spierenburg – keyboards
Jeroen van Veen – bass guitar
Stephen van Haestregt – drums

Guest musicians
Anneke van Giersbergen – featured vocals on "Somewhere" on 24 November 2007 and 7 February 2008
George Oosthoek – featured vocals on "The Other Half (Of Me)" on 24 November 2007 and 7 February 2008
Keith Caputo – featured vocals on "What Have You Done" on 7 February 2008

References

Within Temptation concert tours
2007 concert tours
2008 concert tours
Concert tours of Europe
Concert tours of the United States